David Taylor (born 25 August 1965) is a retired Welsh footballer and current manager. A former forward, he won the European Golden Shoe during the 1993–94 season with Porthmadog. 

He is now a claims advisor for Towergate Insurance

Honours
 League of Wales Golden Boot winner
European Golden Boot winner 93/94: 1993–94

References

External links
David Taylor career stats & birth

1965 births
Living people
Welsh footballers
Association football forwards
Cymru Premier players
Porthmadog F.C. players
Conwy Borough F.C. players
Newtown A.F.C. players
Holywell Town F.C. players
Cefn Druids A.F.C. players
Caersws F.C. players
Inter Cardiff F.C. players
Welshpool Town F.C. players
Oswestry Town F.C. players
Association football coaches